Crosby is a town in Amite and Wilkinson counties, Mississippi, United States. It is part of the McComb, Mississippi micropolitan statistical area. Its population was 242 at the 2020 census.

Geography
Crosby straddles the boundary between Amite County on the north and east and Wilkinson County on the west. In the 2000 census, 258 of the town's 360 residents (71.7%) lived in Wilkinson County and 102 (28.3%) in Amite County. According to the United States Census Bureau, the town has a total area of 2.1 square miles (5.5 km2), of which 2.1 square miles (5.5 km2) is land and 0.47% is water.

Demographics

According to the 2020 United States census, there were 242 people, 99 households, and 59 families residing in the town; its racial and ethnic makeup in 2020 was 72.31% Black or African American, 22.73% non-Hispanic white, 4.13% other or mixed, and 0.83% Hispanic or Latino of any race.

Education
The town of Crosby is served by two public school districts: Amite County and Wilkinson County (for the Wilkinson County portion).

Notable people
 Boyd Brown, former tight end for the Denver Broncos and New York Giants

References

External links
Town of Crosby official website

 

Towns in Amite County, Mississippi
Towns in Wilkinson County, Mississippi
Towns in Mississippi
Towns in McComb micropolitan area